The Touchdown Club of Columbus was founded in Columbus, Ohio, in 1956 by Sam B. Nicola at the request of state auditor James A. Rhodes, who later became governor of the state. Nicola served as the club's president until his death in 1993. More than a decade later, his son Sam Nicola Jr. took over the Touchdown Club. On January 22, 2020, the president of the Touchdown Club of Columbus, Curt Boster, announced on the club's Facebook page the cancellation of the awards, citing difficulty of maintaining the event without a title sponsor.

Awards
The Touchdown Club of Columbus gives several awards to recognize outstanding athletes.

Sammy Baugh Trophy
The Sammy Baugh Trophy is awarded annually to the nation's top collegiate passer.

 1959  – Dick Norman, Stanford
 1960  – Harold Stephens, Hardin-Simmons
 1961  – Ron Miller, Wisconsin
 1962  – Don Trull, Baylor
 1963  – Don Trull, Baylor
 1964	– Jerry Rhome, Tulsa
 1965	– Steve Sloan, Alabama
 1966	– Bob Griese, Purdue
 1967	– Terry Hanratty, Notre Dame
 1968	– Chuck Hixson, SMU
 1969	– Mike Phipps, Purdue
 1970	– Pat Sullivan, Auburn
 1971	– John Reaves, Florida
 1972	– Don Strock, Virginia Tech
 1973	– Jesse Freitas, San Diego State
 1974	– Gary Scheide, Brigham Young
 1975	– Gene Swick, Toledo
 1976	– Tommy Kramer, Rice
 1977	– Guy Benjamin, Stanford
 1978	– Steve Dils, Stanford
 1979	– Marc Wilson, Brigham Young
 1980	– Mark Herrmann, Purdue
 1981	– Jim McMahon, Brigham Young
 1982	– John Elway, Stanford
 1983	– Steve Young, Brigham Young
 1984	– Robbie Bosco, Brigham Young
 1985	– Brian McClure, Bowling Green
 1986	– Vinny Testaverde, Miami (FL)
 1987	– Don McPherson, Syracuse
 1988	– Steve Walsh, Miami (FL)
 1989	– Jeff George, Illinois
 1990	– David Klingler, Houston
 1991	– Ty Detmer, Brigham Young
 1992	– Elvis Grbac, Michigan
 1993	– Trent Dilfer, Fresno State
 1994	– Kerry Collins, Penn State
 1995	– Danny Wuerffel, Florida
 1996	– Steve Sarkisian, Brigham Young
 1997	– Ryan Leaf, Washington State
 1998	– Daunte Culpepper, Central Florida (UCF)
 1999	– Chad Pennington, Marshall
 2000	– Chris Weinke, Florida State
 2001	– David Carr, Fresno State
 2002	– Kliff Kingsbury, Texas Tech
 2003	– B. J. Symons, Texas Tech
 2004	– Stefan LeFors, Louisville
 2005	– Brady Quinn, Notre Dame
 2006	– Colt Brennan, Hawaii
 2007	– Graham Harrell, Texas Tech
 2008	– Sam Bradford, Oklahoma
 2009	– Case Keenum, Houston
 2010	– Landry Jones, Oklahoma
 2011	– Case Keenum, Houston
 2012	– Colby Cameron, Louisiana Tech
 2013	– Derek Carr, Fresno State
 2014	– Brandon Doughty, Western Kentucky 
 2015	– Matt Johnson, Bowling Green
 2016	– Patrick Mahomes, Texas Tech
 2017  – Mason Rudolph, Oklahoma State
 2018 – Dwayne Haskins, Ohio State

Jim Brown Award
This honor goes to the NCAA's top running back, recently named for Hall of Famer Jim Brown.

 1991 – Vaughn Dunbar, Indiana
 1992 – Marshall Faulk, San Diego State
 1993 – Brent Moss, Wisconsin
 1994 – Rashaan Salaam, Colorado
 1995 – Eddie George, Ohio State
 1996 – Troy Davis, Iowa State
 1997 – Ricky Williams, Texas
 1998 – Ricky Williams, Texas
 1999 – Ron Dayne, Wisconsin
 2000 – LaDainian Tomlinson, TCU
 2001 – Luke Staley, BYU
 2002 – Larry Johnson, Penn State
 2003 – Chris Perry, Michigan
 2004 – Adrian Peterson, Oklahoma
 2005 – Reggie Bush, USC
 2006 – Darren McFadden, Arkansas
 2007 – Darren McFadden, Arkansas
 2008 – Shonn Greene, Iowa
 2009 – Toby Gerhart, Stanford
 2010 – LaMichael James, Oregon
 2011 – Montee Ball, Wisconsin
 2012 – Montee Ball, Wisconsin
 2013 – Andre Williams, Boston College
 2014 – Melvin Gordon, Wisconsin
 2015 – Dalvin Cook, Florida State
 2016 – Donnel Pumphrey, San Diego State
 2017 – Bryce Love, Stanford
 2018 – Darrell Henderson, Memphis

Paul Warfield Trophy
Named for Paul Warfield, this honor is given to the nation's top collegiate wide receiver.

 1991 – Desmond Howard, Michigan
 1992 – O. J. McDuffie, Penn State
 1993 – David Palmer, Alabama
 1994 – Michael Westbrook, Colorado
 1995 – Keyshawn Johnson, USC
 1996 – Marcus Harris, Wyoming
 1997 – Randy Moss, Marshall
 1998 – Troy Edwards, Louisiana Tech
 1999 – Peter Warrick, Florida State
 2000 – Santana Moss, Miami
 2001 – Jabar Gaffney, Florida 
 2002 – Charles Rogers, Michigan State
 2003 – Larry Fitzgerald, Pittsburgh 
 2004 – Braylon Edwards, Michigan 
 2005 – Dwayne Jarrett, USC
 2006 – Calvin Johnson, Georgia Tech
 2007 – Michael Crabtree, Texas Tech 
 2008 – Michael Crabtree, Texas Tech
 2009 – Jordan Shipley, Texas
 2010 – Justin Blackmon, Oklahoma State
 2011 – Justin Blackmon, Oklahoma State
 2012 – Marqise Lee, USC
 2013 – Davante Adams, Fresno State
 2014 – Amari Cooper, Alabama
 2015 – Roger Lewis, Bowling Green
 2016 – Corey Davis, Western Michigan
 2017 – Anthony Miller, Memphis
 2018 – Rondale Moore, Purdue

Jim Parker Trophy
Given yearly to the top collegiate offensive lineman. Named for Ohio State great and Hall of Famer Jim Parker.

 1991 – Greg Skrepenak, Michigan
 1992 – Lincoln Kennedy, Washington
 1993 – Aaron Taylor, Notre Dame
 1994 – Zach Wiegert, Nebraska
 1995 – Jonathan Ogden, UCLA
 1996 – Orlando Pace, Ohio State
 1997 – Aaron Taylor, Nebraska
 1998 – Matt Stinchcomb, Georgia
 1999 – Chris McIntosh, Wisconsin
 2000 – Steve Hutchinson, Michigan
 2001 – Bryant McKinnie, Miami 
 2002 – Brett Romberg, Miami 
 2003 – Shawn Andrews, Arkansas 
 2004 – Jammal Brown, Oklahoma 
 2005 – Greg Eslinger, Minnesota 
 2006 – Joe Thomas, Wisconsin 
 2007 – Jake Long, Michigan 
 2008 – Andre Smith, Alabama
 2009 – Russell Okung, Oklahoma State
 2010 – Gabe Carimi, Wisconsin
 2011 – Barrett Jones, Alabama
 2012 – Luke Joeckel, Texas A&M 
 2013 – Cyril Richardson, Baylor
 2014 – Reese Dismukes, Auburn
 2015 – Landon Turner, North Carolina
 2016 - Pat Elflein, Ohio State
 2017 - Billy Price, Ohio State
 2018 - Jonah Williams, Alabama

Bill Willis Trophy
Named for Bill Willis, this award is given yearly to the top collegiate defensive lineman.

 1991 – Steve Emtman, Washington
 1992 – Micheal Barrow, Miami
 1993 – Dan Wilkinson, Ohio State
 1994 – Warren Sapp, Miami
 1995 – Tedy Bruschi, Arizona
 1996 – Grant Wistrom, Nebraska
 1997 – Andre Wadsworth, Florida State
 1998 – Tom Burke, Wisconsin
 1999 – Corey Moore, Virginia Tech
 2000 – Jamal Reynolds, Florida State
 2001 – Julius Peppers, North Carolina 
 2002 – Terrell Suggs, Arizona State 
 2003 – Tommie Harris, Oklahoma 
 2004 – Erasmus James, Wisconsin 
 2005 – Elvis Dumervil, Louisville 
 2006 – Quinn Pitcock, Ohio State 
 2007 – George Selvie, South Florida
 2008 – Brian Orakpo, Texas
 2009 – Ndamukong Suh, Nebraska
 2010 – Ryan Kerrigan, Purdue
 2011 – Whitney Mercilus, Illinois
 2012 – John Simon, Ohio State
 2013 – Aaron Donald, Pittsburgh
 2014 – Joey Bosa, Ohio State
 2015 – Myles Garrett, Texas A&M
 2016 – Ed Oliver, Houston
 2017 – Christian Wilkins, Clemson
 2018 – Quinnen Williams, Alabama

Jack Lambert Trophy
Named for Jack Lambert, this award is given yearly to the top collegiate linebacker.

 1991 – Erick Anderson, Michigan
 1992 – Marvin Jones, Florida State
 1993 – Trev Alberts, Nebraska
 1994 – Derrick Brooks, Florida State; Dana Howard, Illinois (tie)
 1995 – Simeon Rice, Illinois
 1996 – Pat Fitzgerald, Northwestern
 1997 – Andy Katzenmoyer, Ohio State
 1998 – Dat Nguyen, Texas A&M
 1999 – LaVar Arrington, Penn State
 2000 – Dan Morgan, Miami
 2001 – Rocky Calmus, Oklahoma 
 2002 – E. J. Henderson, Maryland 
 2003 – Jonathan Vilma, Miami 
 2004 – Derrick Johnson, Texas 
 2005 – A. J. Hawk, Ohio State 
 2006 – Patrick Willis, Ole Miss 
 2007 – James Laurinaitis, Ohio State 
 2008 – James Laurinaitis, Ohio State 
 2009 – Rolando McClain, Alabama
 2010 – Von Miller, Texas A&M
 2011 – Luke Kuechly, Boston College
 2012 – Jarvis Jones, Georgia
 2013 – Khalil Mack, Buffalo
 2014 – Scooby Wright III, Arizona
 2015 – Joe Schobert, Wisconsin
 2016 – Ben Boulware, Clemson
 2017 – Josey Jewell, Iowa
 2018 – Josh Allen, Kentucky

Jack Tatum Trophy
Since 1991, the Jack Tatum Trophy is given yearly to the top collegiate defensive back. Named after the legendary Jack Tatum

 1991 – Terrell Buckley, Florida State
 1992 – Deon Figures, Colorado
 1993 – Antonio Langham, Alabama
 1994 – Bobby Taylor, Notre Dame
 1995 – Lawyer Milloy, Washington
 1996 – Chris Canty, Kansas State
 1997 – Charles Woodson, Michigan
 1998 – Antoine Winfield, Ohio State
 1999 – Tyrone Carter, Minnesota
 2000 – Jamar Fletcher, Wisconsin
 2001 – Roy Williams, Oklahoma 
 2002 – Mike Doss, Ohio State 
 2003 – Sean Taylor, Miami 
 2004 – Antrel Rolle, Miami 
 2005 – Jimmy Williams, Virginia Tech 
 2006 – Reggie Nelson, Florida
 2007 – Aqib Talib, Kansas
 2008 – Eric Berry, Tennessee
 2009 – Eric Berry, Tennessee
 2010 – Patrick Peterson, LSU
 2011 – David Amerson, North Carolina State
 2012 – Ed Reynolds, Stanford 
 2013 – Darqueze Dennard, Michigan State
 2014 – Gerod Holliman, Louisville
 2015 – Desmond King, Iowa
 2016 – Tarvarus McFadden, Florida State
 2017 – Josh Jackson, Iowa
 2018 – Grant Delpit, LSU

Archie Griffin Award
The Archie Griffin Award signifies college football's most valuable player for the entire season. It is named in honor of the only two-time Heisman Trophy winner, Archie Griffin of Ohio State.

 1999 – Michael Vick, Virginia Tech
 2000 – Josh Heupel, Oklahoma
 2001 – Ken Dorsey, Miami (FL)
 2002 – Ken Dorsey, Miami (FL)
 2003 – Matt Leinart, USC
 2004 – Matt Leinart, USC
 2005 – Vince Young, Texas
 2006 – Troy Smith, Ohio State
 2007 – Pat White, West Virginia
 2008 – Colt McCoy, Texas
 2009 – Toby Gerhart, Stanford
 2010 – Andrew Luck, Stanford
 2011 – Montee Ball, Wisconsin
 2012 – Johnny Manziel, Texas A&M
 2013 – Jameis Winston, Florida State
 2014 – Ezekiel Elliott, Ohio State
 2015 – Deshaun Watson, Clemson
 2016 – Sam Darnold, USC
 2017 – McKenzie Milton, UCF
 2018 – Trevor Lawrence, Clemson

Chic Harley Award
Named for Chic Harley, this award is presented to the College Football Player of the Year.

 1955 – Howard Cassady, Ohio State
 1956 – Paul Hornung, Notre Dame
 1957 – John David Crow, Texas A&M
 1958 – Billy Cannon, LSU
 1959 – Billy Cannon, LSU
 1960 – Joe Bellino, Navy
 1961 – Ernie Davis, Syracuse
 1962 – Terry Baker, Oregon State
 1963 – Roger Staubach, Navy
 1964 – Bob Timberlake, Michigan
 1965 – Mike Garrett, USC
 1966 – Steve Spurrier, Florida
 1967 – Gary Beban, UCLA
 1968 – O. J. Simpson, USC
 1969 – Steve Owens, Oklahoma
 1970 – Jim Plunkett, Stanford
 1971 – Pat Sullivan, Auburn
 1972 – Johnny Rodgers, Nebraska
 1973 – John Cappelletti, Penn State
 1974 – Archie Griffin, Ohio State
 1975 – Archie Griffin, Ohio State
 1976 – Tony Dorsett, Pittsburgh
 1977 – Earl Campbell, Texas
 1978 – Billy Sims, Oklahoma
 1979 – Charles White, USC
 1980 – George Rogers, South Carolina
 1981 – Marcus Allen, USC
 1982 – Herschel Walker,	Georgia
 1983 – Mike Rozier, Nebraska
 1984 – Doug Flutie, Boston College
 1985 – Bo Jackson, Auburn
 1986 – Jim Harbaugh, Michigan
 1987 – Chris Spielman, Ohio State
 1988 – Barry Sanders, Oklahoma State
 1989 – Anthony Thompson, Indiana
 1990 – Greg Lewis, Washington
 1991 – Desmond Howard, Michigan
 1992 – Gino Torretta, Miami
 1993 – Charlie Ward, Florida State
 1994 – Rashaan Salaam, Colorado
 1995 – Eddie George, Ohio State
 1996 – Troy Davis, Iowa State
 1997 – Charles Woodson,	Michigan
 1998 – Ricky Williams, Texas
 1999 – Ron Dayne, Wisconsin
 2000 – Josh Heupel, Oklahoma
 2001 – Ken Dorsey, Miami
 2002 – Ken Dorsey, Miami
 2003 – Larry Fitzgerald, Pittsburgh
 2004 – Reggie Bush, USC
 2005 – Reggie Bush, USC
 2006 – Troy Smith, Ohio State
 2007 – Tim Tebow, Florida
 2008 – Sam Bradford, Oklahoma
 2009 – Colt McCoy, Texas
 2010 – Cam Newton, Auburn
 2011 – Robert Griffin III, Baylor
 2012 – Johnny Manziel, Texas A&M
 2013 – Jordan Lynch, Northern Illinois
 2014 – Marcus Mariota, Oregon
 2015 – Christian McCaffrey, Stanford
 2016 – Deshaun Watson, Clemson
 2017 – Baker Mayfield, Oklahoma
 2018 – Dwayne Haskins, Ohio State

Kellen Moore Award
Previously called the Quarterback of the Year Award, this accolade differs from Sammy Baugh Trophy in that it goes to top quarterback, rather than the top passer. Its name was changed to its current identity in 2012, honoring two-time winner Kellen Moore, who became the FBS all-time leader in wins by a quarterback after going 50–3 as the starter at Boise State.

 1991 – Casey Weldon, Florida State
 1992 – Rick Mirer, Notre Dame
 1993 – Charlie Ward, Florida State
 1994 – Kerry Collins, Penn State
 1995 – Tommie Frazier, Nebraska
 1996 – Danny Wuerffel, Florida 
 1997 – Peyton Manning, Tennessee
 1998 – Tim Couch, Kentucky
 1999 – Joe Hamilton, Georgia Tech 
 2000 – Josh Heupel, Oklahoma
 2001 – Ken Dorsey, Miami 
 2002 – Ken Dorsey, Miami 
 2003 – Jason White, Oklahoma 
 2004 – Matt Leinart, USC
 2005 – Matt Leinart, USC
 2006 – Troy Smith, Ohio State 
 2007 – Tim Tebow, Florida
 2008 – Sam Bradford, Oklahoma
 2009 – Colt McCoy, Texas
 2010 – Kellen Moore, Boise State
 2011 – Kellen Moore, Boise State
 2012 – Collin Klein, Kansas State
 2013 – A. J. McCarron, Alabama
 2014 – Trevone Boykin, TCU
 2015 – Baker Mayfield, Oklahoma
 2016 – Baker Mayfield, Oklahoma
 2017 – J. T. Barrett, Ohio State
 2018 – Dwayne Haskins, Ohio State

Ozzie Newsome Award
Named for Ozzie Newsome, this award is presented annually to the top collegiate tight end.

 2006 – Matt Spaeth, Minnesota
 2007 – Travis Beckum, Wisconsin
 2008 – Jermaine Gresham, Oklahoma
 2009 – Aaron Hernandez, Florida
 2010 – Michael Egnew, Missouri
 2011 – Tyler Eifert, Notre Dame 
 2012 – Zach Ertz, Stanford
 2013 – Jace Amaro, Texas Tech
 2014 – Nick O'Leary, Florida State
 2015 – Jake Butt, Michigan
 2016 – Evan Engram, Mississippi
 2017 – Mark Andrews, Oklahoma
 2018 – T. J. Hockenson, Iowa

Woody Hayes Trophy

Named for Woody Hayes, this award recognizes the top collegiate coach.

 1977 – Lou Holtz, Arkansas
 1978 – Joe Paterno, Penn State
 1979 – Earle Bruce, Ohio State
 1980 – Vince Dooley, Georgia
 1981 – Danny Ford, Clemson
 1982 – Joe Paterno, Penn State
 1983 – Tom Osborne, Nebraska
 1984 – Don James, Washington
 1985 – Bo Schembechler, Michigan
 1986 – Joe Paterno, Penn State
 1987 – Dick MacPherson, Syracuse
 1988 – Lou Holtz, Notre Dame
 1989 – no award
 1990 – Bobby Ross, Georgia Tech
 1991 – Don James, Washington
 1992 – Dennis Erickson, Miami
 1993 – Don Nehlen, West Virginia
 1994 – Tom Osborne, Nebraska
 1995 – Gary Barnett, Northwestern
 1996 – Bruce Snyder, Arizona State
 1997 – Lloyd Carr, Michigan
 1998 – Phillip Fulmer, Tennessee
 1999 – Frank Beamer, Virginia Tech
 2000 – Bob Stoops, Oklahoma
 2001 – Ralph Friedgen, Maryland
 2002 – Jim Tressel, Ohio State
 2003 – Bob Stoops, Oklahoma
 2004 – Urban Meyer, Utah
 2005 – Joe Paterno, Penn State
 2006 – Jim Tressel, Ohio State
 2007 – Mark Mangino, Kansas
 2008 – Mike Leach, Texas Tech
 2009 – Gary Patterson, TCU
 2010 – Jim Harbaugh, Stanford
 2011 – Bill Snyder, Kansas State
 2012 – Urban Meyer, Ohio State
 2013 – Gus Malzahn, Auburn
 2014 – Gary Patterson, TCU
 2015 – Kirk Ferentz, Iowa
 2016 – James Franklin, Penn State
 2017 – Scott Frost, UCF
 2018 – Dabo Swinney, Clemson

Freshman of the Year
Given yearly to the top college football newcomer.

 2001 – Anthony Davis, Wisconsin
 2002 – Maurice Clarett, Ohio State
 2003 – Chris Leak, Florida
 2004 – Adrian Peterson, Oklahoma
 2005 – Tyrell Sutton, Northwestern
 2006 – Colt McCoy, Texas
 2007 – Michael Crabtree, Texas Tech
 2008 – Julio Jones, Alabama
 2009 – Dion Lewis, Pittsburgh
 2010 – Marcus Lattimore, South Carolina
 2011 – Sammy Watkins, Clemson
 2012 – Todd Gurley, Georgia
 2013 – Christian Hackenberg, Penn State
 2014 – Samaje Perine, Oklahoma
 2015 – Tanner Mangum, BYU
 2016 – Jalen Hurts, Alabama
 2017 – J. K. Dobbins, Ohio State
 2018 – Trevor Lawrence, Clemson

Vlade Award
Named in honor of Vlade Janakievski, one of the most accurate placekickers in Ohio State football history, this award is given yearly to the most accurate college football kicker.

 2010 – Alex Henery, Nebraska
 2011 – Brett Maher, Nebraska
 2012 – Jeremy Shelley, Alabama
 2013 – Roberto Aguayo, Florida State
 2014 – Roberto Aguayo, Florida State
 2015 – Aidan Schneider, Oregon
 2016 – Tyler Davis, Penn State
 2017 – Matt Gay, Utah
 2018 – Andre Szmyt, Syracuse

Paul Brown Trophy
Named for Paul Brown, this trophy is presented annually to the NFL Coach of the Year.
 1971 – George Allen, Washington Redskins
 1972 – Don Shula, Miami Dolphins
 1973–76 no awards
 1977 – Red Miller, Denver Broncos
 1978 – Dick Vermeil, Philadelphia Eagles
 1979 – Chuck Noll, Pittsburgh Steelers
 1980 – Leeman Bennett, Atlanta Falcons
 1981 – Sam Rutigliano, Cleveland Browns
 1982 – Forrest Gregg, Cincinnati Bengals
 1983 – Joe Gibbs, Washington Redskins 
 1985 – Mike Ditka, Chicago Bears
 1986 – Marty Schottenheimer, Cleveland Browns
 1987 – Tom Landry, Dallas Cowboys
 1988 – Marv Levy, Buffalo Bills
 1989 – Bill Walsh, San Francisco 49ers
 1990 – Lindy Infante, Green Bay Packers
 1991 – Wayne Fontes, Detroit Lions
 1992 – Bill Cowher, Pittsburgh Steelers
 1993 – Dan Reeves, New York Giants
 1994 – Bill Parcells, New England Patriots
 1995 – Dom Capers, Carolina Panthers
 1996 – Mike Shanahan, Denver Broncos
 1997 – Marty Schottenheimer, Kansas City Chiefs
 1998 – Dan Reeves, Atlanta Falcons 
 1999 – Dick Vermeil, St Louis Rams
 2000 – Jim Haslett, New Orleans Saints
 2001 – Dick Jauron, Chicago Bears
 2002 – Andy Reid, Philadelphia Eagles
 2003 – Bill Belichick, New England Patriots

Joe F. Carr Trophy 
Named for Joseph Carr, this trophy was presented annually (from 1955–1978) to the NFL Player of the Year. This award is not to be confused with the original Joe F. Carr Trophy which was the official National Football League MVP award from 1938–46. However, both trophies are named after Carr, a former NFL commissioner.

 1955 – Fred "Curly" Morrison, Cleveland Browns
 1956 – Rick Casares, Chicago Bears,
 1957 – Johnny Unitas, Baltimore Colts
 1958 – Jim Brown, Cleveland Browns
 1959 – Johnny Unitas, Baltimore Colts
 1960 – Norm Van Brocklin, Philadelphia Eagles
 1961 – Paul Hornung, Green Bay Packers
 1962 – Jim Taylor, Green Bay Packers
 1963 – Y. A. Tittle, New York Giants
 1964 – Johnny Unitas, Baltimore Colts
 1965 – Jim Brown, Cleveland Browns
 1966 – Bart Starr, Green Bay Packers
 1967
 NFL – Johnny Unitas, Baltimore Colts
 AFL – Daryle Lamonica, Oakland Raiders
 1968
 NFL – Leroy Kelly, Cleveland Browns
 AFL – Lance Alworth, San Diego Chargers
 1969
 NFL – Roman Gabriel, Los Angeles Rams
 AFL – Daryle Lamonica, Oakland Raiders
 1970 – George Blanda, Oakland Raiders
 1971 – Bob Griese, Miami Dolphins
 1972 – Larry Brown, Washington Redskins
 1973 – O. J. Simpson, Buffalo Bills
 1974 – Ken Stabler, Oakland Raiders
 1975 – O. J. Simpson, Buffalo Bills
 1976 – Roger Staubach, Dallas Cowboys
 1977 – Walter Payton, Chicago Bears 
 1978 – Earl Campbell, Houston Oilers
 1979 – Dan Fouts, San Diego Chargers
 1980 – Brian Sipe, Cleveland Browns
 1981 – Ken Anderson, Cincinnati Bengals

Sam B. Nicola Trophy
Named for the club's founder, this trophy is presented annually to the National High School Player of the Year.
 1981 – Kevin Wilhite, Cordova, CA
 1982 – Robert Banks, Hampton, VA
 1983 – Chris Spielman, Massilon, OH
 1984 – Ned Bolcar, Phillipsburg, NJ
 1985 – Jeff George, Indianapolis, IN
 1986 – Emmitt Smith, Pensacola, FL
 1987 – Todd Marinovich, Mission Viejo, CA
 1988 – Alonzo Spellman, Mt Holly, NJ
 1989 – Robert Smith, Euclid, OH
 1990 – Marquette Smith, Winter Park, FL
 1991 – Chris Walsh, Concord, CA
 1992 – Ron Powlus, Berwick, PA
 1993 – Lamont Green, Miami, FL
 1994 – Dan Kendra III, Morgantown, WV
 1995 – Andy Katzenmoyer, Westerville, OH
 1996 – Grant Irons, Middleburg Heights, OH
 1997 – Ron Curry, Hampton, VA
 1998 – Mike Doss, Canton, OH
 1999 – DJ Williams, Sacramento, CA
 2000 – Joe Mauer, St. Paul, MN
 2001 – Maurice Clarett, Youngstown, OH
 2002 – Chris Leak, Charlotte, NC
 2003 – Ted Ginn Jr., Cleveland, OH
 2004 – Ryan Perrilloux, LaPlace, LA
 2005 – Brady Quinn, Columbus, OH
 2006 – Myron Rolle, Princeton, NJ
 2007 – Jimmy Clausen, Thousand Oaks, CA
 2008 – Terrelle Pryor, Jeanette, PA
 2009 – Lamarcus Joyner, Miami, FL
 2010 – Malcolm Brown, Brenham, TX
 2011 – Johnathan Gray, Aledo, TX
 2012 – Max Browne, Sammamish, WA
 2012 – Vernon Hargreaves III, Manchester, CO
 2013 – Elijah Hood, Charlotte, NC
 2014 – Josh Rosen, Bellflower, CA
 2015 – Jacob Eason, Lake Stevens, WA
 2016 – Alex Huston, Springfield, MO
 2017 – Zamir White, Laurinburg, NC
 2018 – Ryan Hilinski, Orange, CA

James A. Rhodes Trophy
The James A. Rhodes Trophy is awarded annually to the Ohio High School player of the year.  It is named for former Governor of Ohio James A. Rhodes, who was state auditor when he made the suggestion that led to the founding of the Touchdown Club of Columbus.

 1969 – Steve Mauger, Massillon
 1970 – Ted McNulty, Upper Arlington
 1971 – Rick Middleton, Delaware Hayes
 1972 – Archie Griffin, Eastmoor
 1973 – Mike Gayles, Cincinnati Princeton
 1974 – Ted Bell, Youngstown Mooney
 1975 – John Ziepler, Warren Harding
 1976 – Joe Portale, St Edward
 1977 – Tim Koegel, Cincinnati Moeller
 1978 – Art Schlichter, Miami Trace
 1979 – Ken Roundtree, Cincinnati Moeller
 1980 – Eric Ellington, Cincinnati Moeller
 1981 – Mark Brooks, Cincinnati Moeller
 1982 – Tony Grant, Fremont Ross
 1983 – Hiawatha Francisco, Cincinnati Moeller
 1984 – Chris Spielman, Massillon
 1985 – Mark Kamphous, Cincinnati Moeller
 1986 – Jeff Davidson, Westerville North
 1987 – Carlos Snow, Cincinnati Academy
 1988 – Ronald Howe, Zanesville
 1989 – Roger Harper, Columbus Independence
 1990 – Robert Smith, Euclid
 1991 – Korey Stringer, Warren Harding
 1992 – Mike Vrabel, Walsh Jesuit
 1993 – Dee Miller, Springfield
 1994 – Charles Woodson, Fremont Ross
 1995 – Andy Katzenmoyer, Westerville South
 1996 – Derek Combs, Grove City
 1997 – Tony Fisher, Euclid
 1998 – Mike Doss, Canton McKinley
 1999 – Brandon Childress, Cleveland Chanel
 2000 – Jeff Backes, Upper Arlington
 2000 – Maurice Hall, Columbus Brookhaven
 2001 – Justin Zwick, Massillon Washington
 2001 – Maurice Clarett, Warren Harding
 2002 – Donte Whitner, Cleveland Glenville
 2003 – Ted Ginn Jr., Cleveland Glenville
 2004 – Jamario O'Neal, Cleveland Glenville
 2005 – Chris Wells, Akron Garfield
 2006 – Brandon Saine, Piqua
 2007 – Jake Stoneburner, Dublin Coffman
 2008 – Zach Boren, Pickerington Central
 2009 – Braxton Miller, Huber Heights Wayne
 2010 – Braxton Miller, Huber Heights Wayne
 2011 – Maty Mauk, Kenton
 2012 – Mitch Trubisky, Mentor
 2013 – Grant Sherman, Kenton
 2014 – Joe Burrow, Athens
 2015 
 2016 – Daniel Bangura, Harvest Prep
 2017 – Isaiah Bowser, Sidney
 2018 – Mark Waid, Girard

Male Athlete of the Year

 2007 – Dalton Carriker, Little League World Series
 2008 – Myron Rolle, Florida State football
 2009 – Jake Coffman, Northern Illinois
 2010 – Owen Marecic, Stanford football
 2011 – Chandler Harnish, Northern Illinois football
 2012 – Johnny Manziel, Texas A&M football
 2013 – Keenan Reynolds, Navy football
 2014 – Logan Stieber, Ohio State wrestling
 2015 – Reggie Owens, South Carolina State
 2016 – Andrew Beckwith, Coastal Carolina baseball
 2017 – Shaquem Griffin, UCF football
 2018 – Antwan Dixon, Kent State football

Female Athlete of the Year

 2007 – Courtney Kupets, Georgia
 2008 – Angela Tincher, Virginia Tech
 2009 – Megan Hodge, Penn State volleyball
 2010 – Katie Spotz, adventurer
 2011
 2012 – Kayla Harrison, judo (Olympic gold medalist)
 2013 – Micha Hancock, Penn State
 2014 – Lauren Hill, Mount St. Joseph basketball
 2015 – Margo Greer, Arizona
 2016
 2017 – Sabrina Anderson, Slippery Rock

President's Award

 2011 – Jordan White, Western Michigan University
 2011 – Ross Franklin, Johnstown High School
 2012 – Zac Dysert, Miami University
 2013 – Ryan Switzer, North Carolina
 2013 – Cartel Brooks, Heidelberg College
 2014 – Cardale Jones, Ohio State University
 2015 – Kody Kasey, Georgetown College
 2016 – Joshua Dobbs, Tennessee
 2018 – Jeff Monken, Army West Point

TDC Lifetime Achievement Award
The Touchdown Club also gives the annual TDC Lifetime Achievement Award to a selected athlete.

 1991 – Olga Korbut, Olympic Gymnastics
 1992 – Nadia Comăneci, Olympic Gymnastics
 1993 – Evander Holyfield, Boxing
 1994 – Jerry Lucas, Basketball Hall of Fame
 1995 – Sparky Anderson, Baseball Hall of Fame
 1996 – Bobby Hull, Hockey Hall of Fame
 1997 – Jim Brown, Football Hall of Fame
 1998 – George Steinbrenner, New York Yankees
 1999 
 2000 – Lamar Hunt, American Football League
 2001
 2002
 2003 – Hopalong Cassady, College Football Hall of Fame
 2004 – Joe Nuxhall, Baseball
 2005
 2006 – John Havlicek, Basketball Hall of Fame
 2006 – Bevo Francis, Basketball
 2007
 2008 – Chuck Ealey, Football
 2009 – Archie Griffin, College Football Hall of Fame
 2010 – Coach Chris Ault, College Football Hall of Fame
 2011 – Coach Chuck Kyle, Football
 2012 – Coach Tom Osborne, College Football Hall of Fame
 2013 
 2014
 2015 – Coach Don Donoher, Football
 2016 – Peter Hanson, Ohio State volleyball
 2017 – Larry Kehres, Mount Union football
 2018 – Katie Smith, Naismith and Women's Basketball Halls of Fame

FCS Player of the Year
 2011 – Timothy Flanders, Sam Houston State
 2012 – Taylor Heinicke, Old Dominion
 2013 – Terrance West, Towson
 2014 – Marshaun Coprich, Illinois State
 2015 – Eli Jenkins, Jacksonville State
 2016 – Gage Gubrud, Eastern Washington
 2017 – Jeremiah Briscoe, Sam Houston State
 2018 – Devlin Hodges, Samford

See also 
Bert Bell Award
Maxwell Football Club
Washington D.C. Touchdown Club
Kansas City Committee of 101 Awards
National Football League Most Valuable Player Award
NFL Defensive Player of the Year Award
NFL Offensive Player of the Year Award
UPI AFL-AFC Player of the Year
UPI NFC Player of the Year

References

External links
 

College football awards organizations
1956 establishments in Ohio